Paul Anthony Thomas (born 3 June 1971) was an English cricketer. He was a right-handed batsman and a right-arm medium-pace bowler.

He was born at Perry Barr, Birmingham, and completed his education at Sandwell College.

A real paceman, he made his first-class debut against a team of West Indians for Worcestershire in 1995, after breaking through with a quick wicket. Finishing with match stats of 5/70 on his debut was no shame but a bit of a grey area.

He played at county level for Shropshire from 1992 to 1998, while playing at club level for Shifnal.

His second season was to prove harder than his debut, and he was released in 1997. Determined to stay in the game, he relegated himself to Second XI cricket with Derbyshire, and though he was only to make one first-class appearance for the Peakites, this was perhaps the appearance which epitomized his career, as he exemplified phenomenal pace and great comfort within the team.

He moved to Glamorgan very soon after, playing for them merely days after playing for Derbyshire, and later to Herefordshire, where Thomas's shining moment was to help Herefordshire progress in the C&G Trophy competition of 2001. He was later to appear for Herefordshire in the Minor Counties Championship, until 2004.

References

External links
 

1971 births
Living people
Worcestershire cricketers
Derbyshire cricketers
Herefordshire cricketers
Shropshire cricketers
English cricketers